Azamnagar Road railway station is a railway station on the Howrah–New Jalpaiguri line of Katihar railway division of Northeast Frontier Railway zone. It is situated at Barhat, Azamnagar of Katihar district in the Indian state of Bihar. Toatal 24 Express and passengers trains stop at Azamnagar Road railway station.

References

Railway stations in Katihar district
Katihar railway division